Jack Martin was a professional American football player who played offensive lineman for three seasons for the Los Angeles Rams.

References

1922 births
American football offensive linemen
Los Angeles Rams players
Princeton Tigers football players
2008 deaths